Kirovsky District is an administrative district (raion), one of the twenty-six in Stavropol Krai, Russia. Municipally, it is incorporated as Kirovsky Municipal District. It is located in the south of the krai. Its administrative center is the town of Novopavlovsk. Population:  67,317 (2002 Census); 55,074 (1989 Census). The population of Novopavlovsk accounts for 37.0% of the district's total population.

References

Notes

Sources

Districts of Stavropol Krai